The David O. Selznick Achievement Award in Theatrical Motion Pictures is awarded annually by the Producers Guild of America (PGA) at the Producers Guild of America Awards ceremonies recognizing the individual's outstanding body of work in motion pictures. The award category was instituted in 1989 and first awarded at the 1st Producers Guild Awards.

History 
The award is named after American film producer David O. Selznick (1902–1965). As of the 34th Producers Guild of America Awards, there have been 40 awards presented.

Award winners

 1st: Hal Roach
 2nd: Stanley Kramer
 3rd: Pandro S. Berman
 4th: Richard D. Zanuck and David Brown
 5th: Saul Zaentz
 6th: Howard W. Koch
 7th: Walter Mirisch
 8th: Billy Wilder
 9th: Clint Eastwood
 10th: Steven Bochco
 11th: Jerry Bruckheimer
 12th: Brian Grazer
 13th: Lawrence Gordon
 14th: Robert Evans
 15th: Dino De Laurentiis
 16th: Laura Ziskin
 17th: Roger Corman 
 18th: Douglas Wick and Lucy Fisher
 19th: Frank Marshall and Kathleen Kennedy
 20th: Michael Douglas
 21st: John Lasseter
 22nd: Scott Rudin
 23rd: Steven Spielberg
 24th: Eric Fellner and Tim Bevan
 25th: Michael G. Wilson and Barbara Broccoli
 26th: Gale Anne Hurd
 27th: David Heyman
 28th: Irwin Winkler
 29th: Charles Roven
30th: Kevin Feige
31st: Brad Pitt, Dede Gardner, and Jeremy Kleiner
32nd: not awarded
33rd: Mary Parent
34th: Tom Cruise

References

David O. Selznick Achievement Award